Taranto Cras Basket is an Italian women's basketball club from Taranto. Cras is an acronym from Centro Ricreativo d'Attività Sportive.

Cras Taranto has won the Italian championship in 2003, 2009, 2010 and 2012. It reached the final of the 2009 Eurocup, lost to Galatasaray SK, and it made its debut in the Euroleague the following year. Its best result to date was reaching the quarterfinals in 2011.

Titles
 Serie A
 2003, 2009, 2010, 2012
 Coppa Italia
 2003, 2012
 Suppercopa
 2003, 2009, 2010

2011-12 squad
  Gintarė Petronytė (1.96)
  Sara Giauro (1.90)
  Nicole Antibe (1.87)
  Megan Mahoney (1.85)
  Abiola Wabara (1.83)
  Valentina Siccardi (1.82)
  Ilaria Zanoni (1.80)
  Stella Panella (1.77)
  Liron Cohen (1.73)
  Giulia Gatti (1.68)

References

Cras
Cras
Basketball teams established in 1961